Dan White (born 1 May 1989) is a professional rugby union player for Leeds Carnegie. White joined Leeds Carnegie in 2006 and is a graduate of Hymers College in Hull.

His primary position is at scrum-half. White was formally the Under 16 British Badminton Champion and remains unbeaten to this day, he was also part of the UK's most successful rounders team in 2008. He had now taken up teaching at Bishop Vesey’s Grammar School captaining the staff football team to a national championship.

References

External links

1989 births
Living people
English rugby union players
Leeds Tykes players
Rugby union players from Kingston upon Hull
Rugby union scrum-halves